Samuel Houston (March 2, 1793 – July 26, 1863) was an American and Texan general and statesman who played an important role in the Texas Revolution. He served as the first and third president of the Republic of Texas and was one of the first two individuals to represent Texas in the United States Senate. He also served as the sixth governor of Tennessee and the seventh governor of Texas, the only individual to be elected governor of two different states in the United States.

Born in Rockbridge County, Virginia, Houston and his family migrated to Maryville, Tennessee, when Houston was a teenager. Houston later ran away from home and spent about three years living with the Cherokee, becoming known as Raven. He served under General Andrew Jackson in the War of 1812, and after the war, he presided over the removal of many Cherokee from Tennessee. With the support of Jackson and others, Houston won election to the United States House of Representatives in 1823. He strongly supported Jackson's presidential candidacies, and in 1827, Houston was elected as the governor of Tennessee. In 1829, after divorcing his first wife, Houston resigned from office, and moved to Arkansas Territory.

Houston settled in Texas in 1832. After the Battle of Gonzales, he helped organize Texas's provisional government and was selected as the top-ranking official in the Texian Army. He led the Texan Army to victory at the Battle of San Jacinto, the decisive battle in Texas's war for independence against Mexico. After the war, Houston won election in the 1836 Texas presidential election. He left office due to term limits in 1838 but won election to another term in the 1841 Texas presidential election. Houston played a key role in the annexation of Texas by the United States in 1845, and in 1846, he was elected to represent Texas in the United States Senate. He joined the Democratic Party and supported President James K. Polk's prosecution of the Mexican–American War.

His Senate record was marked by his unionism and opposition to extremists from both the 
North and South. He voted for the Compromise of 1850, which settled many of the territorial issues left over from the Mexican–American War and the annexation of Texas. He later voted against the Kansas–Nebraska Act because he believed it would lead to increased sectional tensions over slavery, and his opposition to that act led him to leave the Democratic Party. He was an unsuccessful candidate for the presidential nomination of the American Party in the 1856 presidential election and the Constitutional Union Party in the 1860 presidential election. In 1859, Houston won election as the governor of Texas. In this role, he opposed secession and unsuccessfully sought to keep Texas out of the Confederate States of America. He was forced out of office in 1861 and died in 1863. Houston's name has been honored in numerous ways, and he is the eponym of the city of Houston, the fourth most populous city in the United States.

Early life

Samuel Houston was born in Rockbridge County, Virginia, on March 2, 1793, to Samuel Houston and Elizabeth Paxton. Both of Houston's parents were descended from Scottish and Irish immigrants who had settled in Colonial America in the 1730s, including his great-grandfather John Houston. Houston's father was descended from Ulster Scots people. Samuel inherited the Timber Ridge plantation and mansion in Rockbridge County, Virginia that was worked by enslaved African Americans. During the American Revolutionary War, Captain Houston served in Morgan's Rifle Brigade as a paymaster. He served in the Virginia militia, which required him to pay his own expenses and to be away from his family for long periods of time. The plantation and the family's finances suffered as a result.

He had five brothers and three sisters: Paxton, Robert, James who married Patience Bills, John, William who married Mary Ball, Isabella, Mary who married Matthew Wallace and then his nephew Williams Wallace, and Eliza who married Samuel Moore.

His father, Samuel, planned to sell Timber Ridge and move west to Tennessee, where land was less expensive, but he died in 1806. Elizabeth, his mother, followed through on those plans and settled the family near Maryville, the seat of Blount County, Tennessee. At this time, Tennessee was on the American frontier, and even larger towns like Nashville were vigilant against Native American raids. He had dozens of cousins who lived in the surrounding area of east-central Tennessee. When they arrived, Elizabeth cleared the land, built a house, and planted crops. Her oldest children, Paxton, Isabella, and Robert died within a few years after they arrived in Tennessee. Elizabeth relied on James and John to run the store in Maryville, operate the farm, and watch over the younger children.

He had a care-free disposition, however, and liked to escape to explore the frontier. He was at odds with concepts of hell and damnation of his mother's religion, Presbyterianism, and he was not interested schooling. He did take an interest in his father's library, reading works by classical authors like Virgil as well as more recent works by authors such as Jedidiah Morse.

Not interested in farming and working in the family store, at the age of 16, he left his family to live with a Cherokee tribe led by Chief John Jolly (Cherokee name: Ahuludegi, also spelled Oolooteka) on Hiwassee Island. Houston formed a close relationship with Jolly and learned the Cherokee language, becoming known as Raven. According to James L. Haley, he appreciated the "free and unsophisticated spiritual expression of the Native Americans". He left the tribe to return to Maryville in 1812, and he was hired at age 19 for a term as the schoolmaster of a one-room schoolhouse. He attended Porter Academy, where he was taught by Rev. Isaac L. Anderson (founder of Maryville College).

According to biographer John Hoyt Williams, Houston was not close with his siblings or his parents, and he rarely spoke of them in his later life. Haley states that he was interested in his younger brother's and his sisters' welfare when he lived on Hiwassee Island. He felt used by the rest of the family.

War of 1812 and aftermath
In 1812, Houston enlisted in the United States Army, which then was engaged in the War of 1812 against Britain and Britain's Native American allies. He quickly impressed the commander of the 39th Infantry Regiment, Thomas Hart Benton, and by the end of 1813, Houston had risen to the rank of the third lieutenant. In early 1814, the 39th Infantry Regiment became a part of the force commanded by General Andrew Jackson, who was charged with putting an end to raids by a faction of the Muscogee (or "Creek") tribe in the Old Southwest. Houston was wounded badly in the Battle of Horseshoe Bend, the decisive battle in the Creek War. Although army doctors expected him to die of his wounds, Houston survived and convalesced in Maryville and other locations. While many other officers lost their positions after the end of the War of 1812 due to military cutbacks, Houston retained his commission with the help of Congressman John Rhea. During that time he was promoted to the rank of second lieutenant.

Sometime in early 1817, Sam Houston was assigned to a clerical position in Nashville, serving under the adjutant general for the army's Southern Division. Later in the year, Jackson appointed Houston as a sub-agent to handle the removal of Cherokee from East Tennessee. In February 1818, he received a strong reprimand from Secretary of War John C. Calhoun after he wore Native American dress to a meeting between Calhoun and Cherokee leaders, beginning an enmity that lasted until Calhoun's death in 1850. Angry over the incident with Calhoun and an investigation into his activities, Houston resigned from the army in 1818. He continued to act as a government liaison with the Cherokee, and in 1818, he helped some of the Cherokee resettle in Arkansas Territory.

Early political career
After leaving government service, Houston began an apprenticeship with Judge James Trimble in Nashville. He quickly won admission to the state bar and opened a legal practice in Lebanon, Tennessee. With the aid of Governor Joseph McMinn, Houston won election as the district attorney for Nashville in 1819. He was also appointed as a major general of the Tennessee militia. Like his mentors, Houston was a member of the Democratic-Republican Party, which dominated state and national politics in the decade following the War of 1812. Tennessee gained three seats in the United States House of Representatives after the 1820 United States Census, and, with the support of Jackson and McMinn, Houston ran unopposed in the 1823 election for Tennessee's 9th congressional district. In his first major speech in Congress, Houston advocated for the recognition of Greece, which was fighting a war of independence against the Ottoman Empire.

Houston strongly supported Jackson's candidacy in the 1824 presidential election, which saw four major candidates, all from the Democratic-Republican Party, run for president. As no candidate won a majority of the vote, the House of Representatives held a contingent election, which was won by John Quincy Adams. Supporters of Jackson eventually coalesced into the Democratic Party, and those who favored Adams became known as National Republicans. With Jackson's backing, Houston won election as governor of Tennessee in 1827. Governor Houston advocated the construction of internal improvements such as canals, and sought to lower the price of land for homesteaders living on public domain. He also aided Jackson's successful campaign in the 1828 presidential election.

In January 1829, Houston married Eliza Allen, the daughter of wealthy plantation owner John Allen of Gallatin, Tennessee. The marriage quickly fell apart possibly because Allen loved another man, or because some physical problem prevented the marriage from being consummated. In April 1829, following the collapse of his marriage, Houston resigned as governor of Tennessee. Shortly after leaving office, he traveled to Arkansas Territory to rejoin the Cherokee.

Political exile and controversy
Houston was reunited with Ahuludegi's group of Cherokee in mid-1829. Because of Houston's experience in government and his connections with President Jackson, several local Native American tribes asked Houston to mediate disputes and communicate their needs to the Jackson administration. In late 1829, the Cherokee accorded Houston tribal membership and dispatched him to Washington to negotiate several issues. In anticipation of the removal of the remaining Cherokee east of the Mississippi River, Houston made an unsuccessful bid to supply rations to the Native Americans during their journey. When Houston returned to Washington in 1832, Congressman William Stanbery alleged that Houston had placed a fraudulent bid in 1830 in collusion with the Jackson administration. On April 13, 1832, after Stanbery refused to answer Houston's letters regarding the incident, Houston beat Stanbery with a cane. After the beating, the House of Representatives brought Houston to trial. By a vote of 106 to 89, the House convicted Houston, and Speaker of the House Andrew Stevenson formally reprimanded Houston. A federal court also required Houston to pay $500 in damages.

Texas Revolution

In mid-1832, Houston's friends William H. Wharton and John Austin Wharton wrote to convince him to travel to the Mexican possession of Texas, where unrest among the American settlers was growing. The Mexican government had invited Americans to settle the sparsely populated region of Texas, but many of the settlers, including the Whartons, disliked Mexican rule. Houston crossed into Texas in December 1832, and shortly thereafter, he was granted land in Texas. Houston was elected to represent Nacogdoches, Texas at the Convention of 1833, which was called to petition Mexico for statehood (at the time, Texas was part of the state of Coahuila y Tejas). Houston strongly supported statehood, and he chaired a committee that drew a proposed state constitution. After the convention, Texan leader Stephen F. Austin petitioned the Mexican government for statehood, but he was unable to come to an agreement with President Valentín Gómez Farías. In 1834, Antonio López de Santa Anna assumed the presidency, took on new powers, and arrested Austin. In October 1835, the Texas Revolution broke out with the Battle of Gonzales, a skirmish between Texan forces and the Mexican Army. Shortly after the battle, Houston was elected to the Consultation, a congregation of Texas leaders.

Along with Austin and others, Houston helped organize the Consultation into a provisional government for Texas. In November, Houston joined with most other delegates in voting for a measure that demanded Texas statehood and the restoration of the 1824 Constitution of Mexico. The Consultation appointed Houston as a major general and the highest-ranking officer of the Texian Army, though the appointment did not give him effective control of the militia units that constituted the Texian Army. Houston helped organize the Convention of 1836, where the Republic of Texas declared independence from Mexico, and appointed him as Commander-in-Chief of the Texas Army. Shortly after the declaration, the convention received a plea for assistance from William B. Travis, who commanded Texan forces under siege by Santa Anna at the Alamo. The convention confirmed Houston's command of the Texian Army and dispatched him to lead a relief of Travis's force, but the Alamo fell before Houston could organize his forces at Gonzales, Texas. Seeking to intimidate Texan forces into surrender, the Mexican army killed every defender at the Alamo; news of the defeat outraged many Texans and caused desertions in Houston's ranks. Commanding a force of about 350 men that numerically was inferior to that of Santa Anna, Houston retreated east across the Colorado River.

Though the provisional government, as well as many of his own subordinates, urged him to attack the Mexican army, Houston continued the retreat east, informing his soldiers that they constituted "the only army in Texas now present ... There are but a few of us, and if we are beaten, the fate of Texas is sealed." Santa Anna divided his forces and finally caught up to Houston in mid-April 1836. Santa Anna's force of about 1,350 soldiers trapped Houston's force of 783 men in a marsh; rather than pressing the attack, Santa Anna ordered his soldiers to make camp. On April 21, Houston ordered an attack on the Mexican army, beginning the Battle of San Jacinto. The Texans quickly routed Santa Anna's force, though Houston's horse was shot out under him and his ankle was shattered by a stray bullet. In the aftermath of the Battle of San Jacinto, a detachment of Texans captured Santa Anna. Santa Anna was forced to sign the Treaty of Velasco, granting Texas its independence. Houston stayed briefly for negotiations, then returned to the United States for treatment of his ankle wound.

President of Texas

Victory in the Battle of San Jacinto made Houston a hero to many Texans, and he won the 1836 Texas presidential election, defeating Stephen F. Austin, another former governor who would also receive the honor of having the city of Austin named after him, and Henry Smith. Houston took office on October 22, 1836, after interim president David G. Burnet resigned. During the presidential election, the voters of Texas overwhelmingly indicated their desire for Texas to be annexed by the United States. Houston, meanwhile, faced the challenge of assembling a new government, putting the country's finances in order, and handling relations with Mexico. He selected Thomas Jefferson Rusk as secretary of war, Smith as secretary of the treasury, Samuel Rhoads Fisher as secretary of the navy, James Collinsworth as attorney general, and Austin as secretary of state. Houston sought normalized relations with Mexico, and despite some resistance from the legislature, arranged the release of Santa Anna. Concerned about upsetting the balance between slave states and free states, U.S. President Andrew Jackson refused to push for the annexation of Texas, but in his last official act in office he granted Texas diplomatic recognition. With the United States unwilling to annex Texas, Houston began courting British support; as part of this effort, he urged the end of the importation of slaves into Texas.

In early 1837, the government moved to a new capital, the city of Houston, named after him as the country's first president. In 1838, Houston frequently clashed with Congress over issues such as a treaty with the Cherokee and a land-office act and was forced to put down the Córdova Rebellion, a plot to allow Mexico to reclaim Texas with aid from the Kickapoo Indians. The Texas constitution barred presidents from seeking a second term, so Houston did not stand for re-election in the 1838 election and left office in late 1838. He was succeeded by Mirabeau B. Lamar, who, along with Burnet, led a faction of Texas politicians opposed to Houston. The Lamar administration removed many of Houston's appointees, launched a war against the Cherokee, and established a new capital at Austin, Texas. Meanwhile, Houston opened a legal practice and co-founded a land company with the intent of developing the town of Sabine City. In 1839, he was elected to represent San Augustine County in the Texas House of Representatives.

Houston defeated Burnet in the 1841 Texas presidential election, winning a large majority of the vote. Houston appointed Anson Jones as secretary of state, Asa Brigham as secretary of the treasury, George Washington Hockley as secretary of war, and George Whitfield Terrell as attorney general. The republic faced a difficult financial situation; at one point, Houston commandeered an American brig used to transport Texas soldiers because the government could not afford to pay the brig's captain. The Santa Fe Expedition and other initiatives pursued by Lamar had stirred tensions with Mexico, and rumors frequently raised fears that Santa Anna would launch an invasion of Texas. Houston continued to curry favor with Britain and France, partly in the hope that British and French influence in Texas would encourage the United States to annex Texas. The Tyler administration made the annexation of Texas its chief foreign policy priority, and in April 1844, Texas and the United States signed an annexation treaty. Annexation did not have sufficient support in Congress, and the United States Senate rejected the treaty in June.

Henry Clay and Martin Van Buren, the respective front-runners for the Whig and Democratic nominations in the 1844 presidential election, both opposed the annexation of Texas. However, Van Buren's opposition to annexation damaged his candidacy, and he was defeated by James K. Polk, an acolyte of Jackson and an old friend of Houston, at the 1844 Democratic National Convention. Polk defeated Clay in the general election, giving backers of annexation an electoral mandate. Meanwhile, Houston's term ended in December 1844, and he was succeeded by Anson Jones, his secretary of state. In the waning days of his own presidency, Tyler used Polk's victory to convince Congress to approve of the annexation of Texas. Seeking Texas's immediate acceptance of annexation, Tyler made Texas a generous offer that allowed the state to retain control of its public lands, though it would be required to keep its public debt. A Texas convention approved of the offer of annexation in July 1845, and Texas officially became the 28th U.S. state on December 29, 1845.

U.S. Senator

Mexican–American War and aftermath (1846–1853)

In February 1846, the Texas legislature elected Houston and Thomas Jefferson Rusk as Texas's two inaugural U.S. senators. Houston chose to align with the Democratic Party, which contained many of his old political allies, including President Polk. As a former president of Texas, Houston is the only former foreign head of state to have served in the U.S. Congress. He was the first person to serve as the governor of a state and then be elected to the U.S. Senate by another state. In 2018, Mitt Romney became the second.
William W. Bibb accomplished the same feat in reverse order.

Breaking with the Senate tradition that held that freshman senators were not to address the Senate, Houston strongly advocated in early 1846 for the annexation of Oregon Country. In the Oregon Treaty, reached later in 1846, Britain and the United States agreed to split Oregon Country. Meanwhile, Polk ordered General Zachary Taylor to lead a U.S. army to the Rio Grande, which had been set as the Texas-Mexico border under the Treaty of Velasco; Mexico claimed the Nueces River constituted the true border. After a skirmish between Taylor's unit and the Mexican army, the Mexican–American War broke out in April 1846. Houston initially supported Polk's prosecution of the war, but differences between the two men emerged in 1847. After two years of fighting, the United States defeated Mexico and, through the Treaty of Guadalupe Hidalgo, acquired the Mexican Cession. Mexico also agreed to recognize the Rio Grande as the border between Mexico and Texas.

After the war, disputes over the extension of slavery into the territories raised sectional tensions. Unlike most of his Southern colleagues, Houston voted for the Oregon Bill of 1848, which organized Oregon Territory as a free territory. Defending his vote to create a territory that excluded slavery, Houston stated "I would be the last man to wish to do anything injurious to the South, but I do not think that on all occasions we are justified in agitating [slavery]." He criticized both Northern abolitionists and Democratic followers of Calhoun as extremists who sought to undermine the union. He supported the Compromise of 1850, a sectional compromise on slavery on the territories. Under the compromise, California was admitted as a free state, the slave trade was prohibited in the District of Columbia, a more stringent fugitive slave law was passed, and Utah Territory and New Mexico Territory were established. Texas gave up some of its claims on New Mexico, but it retained El Paso, Texas, and the United States assumed Texas's large public debt. Houston sought the Democratic nomination in the 1852 presidential election, but he was unable to consolidate support outside of his home state. The 1852 Democratic National Convention ultimately nominated Franklin Pierce, a compromise nominee, who went on to win the election.

Pierce and Buchanan administrations (1853–1859)

In 1854, Senator Stephen A. Douglas led the passage of the Kansas–Nebraska Act, which organized Kansas Territory and Nebraska Territory. The act also repealed the Missouri Compromise, an act that had banned slavery in territories north of parallel 36°30′ north. Houston voted against the act, in part because he believed that Native Americans would lose much of their land as a result of the act. He also perceived that it would lead to increased sectional tensions over slavery. Houston's opposition to the Kansas–Nebraska Act led to his departure from the Democratic Party. In 1855, Houston began to be associated publicly with the American Party, the political wing of the nativist and unionist Know Nothing movement. The Whig Party had collapsed after the passage of the Kansas–Nebraska Act, and the Know Nothings and the anti-slavery Republican Party had both emerged as major political movements. Houston's affiliation with the party stemmed in part from his fear of the growing influence of Catholic voters; though he opposed barring Catholics from holding office, he wanted to extend the naturalization period for immigrants to 21 years. He was attracted to the Know Nothing's support for a Native American state as well the party's unionist stance.

Houston sought the presidential nomination at the Know Nothing party's 1856 national convention, but the party nominated former President Millard Fillmore. Houston was disappointed by Fillmore's selection as well as the party platform, which did not rebuke the Kansas–Nebraska Act, but he eventually decided to support Fillmore's candidacy. Despite Houston's renewed support, the American Party split over slavery, and Democrat James Buchanan won the 1856 presidential election. The American Party collapsed after the election, and Houston did not affiliate with a national political party for the remainder of his tenure in the senate. In the 1857 Texas gubernatorial election, Texas Democrats nominated Hardin Richard Runnels, who supported the Kansas–Nebraska Act and attacked Houston's record. In response, Houston announced his own candidacy for governor, but Runnels defeated him by a decisive margin. It was the only electoral defeat of his career. After the gubernatorial election, the Texas legislature denied Houston re-election in the senate; Houston rejected calls to resign immediately and served until the end of his term in early 1859.

Governor of Texas

Houston ran against Runnels in the 1859 gubernatorial election. Capitalizing on Runnels's unpopularity over state issues such as Native American raids, Houston won the election and took office in December 1859. In the 1860 presidential election, Houston and John Bell were the two major contenders for the presidential nomination of the newly formed Constitutional Union Party, which consisted largely of Southern unionists. Houston narrowly trailed Bell on the first ballot of the 1860 Constitutional Union Convention, but Bell clinched the nomination on the second ballot. Nonetheless, some of Houston's Texan supporters nominated him for president in April 1860. Other backers attempted to launch a nationwide campaign, but in August 1860, Houston announced that he would not be a candidate for president. He refused to endorse any of the remaining presidential candidates. In late 1860, Houston campaigned across his home state, calling on Texans to resist those who advocated for secession if Republican nominee Abraham Lincoln won the 1860 election.

After Lincoln won the November 1860 presidential election, several Southern states seceded from the United States and formed the Confederate States of America. A Texas political convention voted to secede from the United States on February 1, 1861, and Houston proclaimed that Texas was once again an independent republic, but he refused to recognize that same convention's authority to join Texas to the Confederacy. After Houston refused to swear an oath of loyalty to the Confederacy, the legislature declared the governorship vacant. Houston did not recognize the validity of his removal, but he did not attempt to use force to remain in office, and he refused aid from the federal government to prevent his removal. His successor, Edward Clark, was sworn in on March 18. In an undelivered speech, Houston wrote:

On April 19, 1861, he told a crowd:

According to historian Randolph Campbell:
Houston did everything possible to prevent secession and war, but his first loyalty was to Texas—and the South. Houston refused offers of troops from the United States to keep Texas in the Union and announced on May 10, 1861 that he would stand with the Confederacy in its war effort.

Retirement and death

After leaving office, Houston returned to his home in Galveston. He later settled in Huntsville, Texas, where he lived in a structure known as the Steamboat House. In the midst of the Civil War, Houston was shunned by many Texas leaders, though he continued to correspond with Confederate officer Ashbel Smith and Texas governor Francis Lubbock. His son, Sam Houston, Jr., served in the Confederate army during the Civil War, but returned home after being wounded at the Battle of Shiloh. Houston's health suffered a precipitous decline in April 1863, and he died on July 26, 1863, at 70 years of age.

The inscription on Houston's tomb reads:
A Brave Soldier. A Fearless Statesman.
A Great Orator—A Pure Patriot.
A Faithful Friend, A Loyal Citizen.
A Devoted Husband and Father.
A Consistent Christian—An Honest Man.

Personal life 

In January 1829 Houston, then Governor of Tennessee, married 19-year-old Eliza Allen. The marriage lasted 11 weeks. Neither Houston nor Eliza ever gave a reason for their separation, but Eliza refused to sanction divorce. Subsequently, he resigned his governorship and went to live with his Cherokee family for three years. In the summer of 1830, Houston married Tiana Rogers (sometimes called Diana), daughter of Chief John "Hellfire" Rogers (1740–1833), a Scots-Irish trader, and Jennie Due (1764–1806), a sister of Chief John Jolly, in a Cherokee ceremony. The ceremony was modest since it was Tiana's second marriage; she was widowed with two children from her previous marriage: Gabriel, born 1819, and Joanna, born 1822. She and Houston first met when she was ten years old, and he was stunned to see how beautiful she was when he returned to her village years later. The two lived together for several years. Tennessee society disapproved of the marriage because under civil law, he was still legally married to Eliza Allen Houston. After declining to accompany Houston to Texas in 1832, Tiana later remarried. She died in 1838 of pneumonia. Will Rogers was her nephew, three generations removed.

In 1837, after becoming President of the Republic of Texas, he was able to acquire, from a district court judge, a divorce from Eliza Allen.

In 1839, he purchased a horse which became one of the foundation sires of the American Quarter Horse breed named Copperbottom. He owned the horse until its death in 1860.

On May 9, 1840, Houston, aged 47, married for a third time. His bride was 21-year-old Margaret Moffette Lea of Marion, Alabama, the daughter of planters. They had eight children. Margaret acted as a tempering influence on her much older husband and convinced him to stop drinking. Although the Houstons had numerous houses, they kept only one continuously: Cedar Point (1840–1863) on Trinity Bay.

In 1833, Houston was baptized into the Catholic faith in order to qualify under the existing Mexican law for property ownership in Coahuila y Tejas. The sacrament was held in the living room of the Adolphus Sterne House in Nacogdoches, Texas. By 1854, Margaret had spent 14 years trying to convert Houston to the Baptist church. With the assistance of George Washington Baines, she convinced Houston to convert, and he agreed to adult baptism. Spectators from neighboring communities came to Independence, Texas, to witness the event. On November 19, 1854, Houston was baptized by Rev. Rufus C. Burleson, president of Baylor University, by immersion in Little Rocky Creek, two miles southeast of Independence.

Relationship to slavery 

Houston was born on and inherited a slave plantation and mansion, and had many slaves throughout his life. While he did not enforce some anti-slavery measures, strong slavery laws were still in place under his leadership. He did not support the westward expansion of slavery. His attitude towards slavery was of pragmatism within the context of his time and place.   Houston owned slaves but held a “centrist” position believing both sides of the slavery debate were too extreme on the issue. Houston’s greatest focus was not splitting up the Union. He thought states should decide for themselves on the issue of slavery.

Legacy

Houston, the largest city in Texas and the American South, is named in his honor. Several other things and places are named for Houston, including Sam Houston State University; Houston County, Minnesota; Houston County, Tennessee; Houston County, Texas. Other monuments and memorials include Sam Houston National Forest, Sam Houston Regional Library and Research Center, U.S. Army post Fort Sam Houston in San Antonio, the USS Sam Houston (SSBN-609), and a sculpture of Houston in the city of Houston's Hermann Park. In addition, a 67-foot-tall statue of Houston, created by sculptor David Adickes, named A Tribute to Courage (and colloquially called "Big Sam") stands next to I-45, between Dallas and Houston, in Huntsville, Texas. Along with Stephen F. Austin, Houston is one of two Texans with a statue in the National Statuary Hall. Houston has been portrayed in works such as Man of Conquest, Gone to Texas, Texas Rising, and The Alamo. In 1960, he was inducted into the Hall of Great Westerners of the National Cowboy & Western Heritage Museum.

There is a question about whether Houston made a pejorative comment about Mexicans in an 1835 speech to the Texas volunteer army at Refugio.  One second hand source makes this claim; however, subsequent research casts doubt on the source and concludes that the disparaging comment is unlikely to have occurred.

See also 
 Joshua Houston
 History of slavery in Texas
 Nathaniel Hale Pryor

Notes

References

Bibliography

Works cited

Further reading

 Brinkley, William. The Texas Revolution Texas A&M Press: .
 
 Sword of San Jacinto, DeBruhl, Marshall; Random House: .
 
 
 Hitsman, J. Mackay. "The Texas War Of 1835-1836." History Today (Feb 1960) 10#2 pp 116–123.
 .
 
 The Eagle and the Raven; Michener, James A.; State House Press: .

External links

 Sam Houston papers (Woodson Research Center, Fondren Library, Rice University, Houston, Texas)
 Life of General Houston, 1793–1863 published 1891, hosted by the Portal to Texas History.
 
 Sam Houston Memorial Museum in Huntsville, Texas
 Sam Houston Historic Schoolhouse in Maryville, Tennessee
 Documentary film Sam Houston: American Statesman, Soldier, and Pioneer. 2009, The Sam Houston Project.
 Tennessee Encyclopedia of History and Culture entry
 Tennessee State Library & Archives, Papers of Governor Sam Houston, 1827–1829
 Sam Houston Rode a Gray Horse
 Houston Family Papers, 1836–1869 and undated, in the Southwest Collection/Special Collections Library at Texas Tech University
 Life and select literary remains of Sam Houston of Texas published 1884

1793 births
1863 deaths
19th-century American politicians
American emigrants to Mexico
American people of Scottish descent
American people of Scotch-Irish descent
American prosecutors
American slave owners
Army of the Republic of Texas generals
Baptists from Tennessee
Baptists from Texas
Baptists from Virginia
Candidates in the 1860 United States presidential election
Confederate States of America state governors
Converts to Baptist denominations from Roman Catholicism
Democratic Party United States senators from Texas
Democratic-Republican Party members of the United States House of Representatives from Tennessee
Democratic-Republican Party state governors of the United States
Governors of Tennessee
Governors of Texas
Independent state governors of the United States
Jacksonian members of the United States House of Representatives from Tennessee
Know-Nothing United States senators
People from Huntsville, Texas
People from Maryville, Tennessee
People from Rockbridge County, Virginia
People from San Augustine, Texas
People of Texas in the American Civil War
People of the Creek War
People of the Texas Revolution
Presidents of the Republic of Texas
Republican Party governors of Texas
Republican Party United States senators from Texas
Signers of the Texas Declaration of Independence
Southern Unionists in the American Civil War
Tennessee lawyers
Texas Consultation delegates
Texas Democrats
Texas Independents
Texas Know Nothings
United States Army officers
United States Army personnel of the War of 1812
United States senators who owned slaves